Ghulam Hussain Khan was an Indian historian from the 18th-century Bengal who is writer of the famous book Seir Mutaqherin (سیر المتاخرین), one of the notable contemporary historical accounts on the late Mughal Empire.

Ghulam Hussain Khan left Delhi after Nader Shah's Sack of Delhi and moved to the court of his cousin, Alivardi Khan, the Nawab of Bengal, in Murshidabad. 
Khan was also related to the next nawab, Siraj ud-Daulah, either through Siraj being Alivardi's grandson or in another way.

He is not to be confused with Ghulam Husain Salim who lived at a similar time.

External links 
 The Siyar-ul-Mutakherin: a history of the Mahomedan power in India during the last century / by Mir Gholam Hussein-Khan; revised from the translation of Haji Mustefa, and collated with the Persian original, by John Briggs. (1832) https://catalog.hathitrust.org/Record/009726806
 Banglapedia article (22 March 2015) on the Siyar-ul-Mutakhkherin:  http://en.banglapedia.org/index.php?title=Siyar-ul-Mutakhkherin
Links to the original Persian books. Volume 1: https://archive.org/details/McGillLibrary-rbsc-ms-bw-ivanow-0010-17594 and Volume 2: https://archive.org/details/McGillLibrary-rbsc-ms-bw-ivanow-0011-17595

References 

18th-century Indian Muslims
18th-century Indian historians
18th-century births
Year of birth unknown
Year of death unknown